Al-Ittihad Sports & Cultural Club is a Yemeni football club based in Ibb.

Achievements
Yemeni League:

Yemeni President Cup: 1
1998

Performance in AFC competitions
Asian Cup Winners Cup: 1 appearance
1999–00: First Round

Current squad

References

Football clubs in Yemen
1967 establishments in Yemen